The Socialist Revolutionary Workers Party (SRWP) is a Marxist-Leninist communist party in South Africa. The party was founded in March 2019 after a pre-launch convention at the end of 2018.

History 
The roots of the SRWP lie in the split between the NUMSA union and the COSATU federation in 2013. The split was mainly caused by the growing discontention of the NUMSA leadership with the ANC, which is supported by the COSATU through the Tripartite Alliance, together with the South African Communist Party. After the split NUMSA general-secretary Irvin Jim announced the formation of a "a new united front". Together with the new SAFTU, the SRWP would be part of this new united front.

The launch in December 2018 was attended by 1,100 delegates from all provinces of South Africa in Boksburg, with delegations from residence associations and members of SAFTU unions in attendance. The party contested in the 2019 South African general election and the provincial elections in all nine provinces, failing to win any seats.

Election results

National elections

|-
! Election
! Total votes
! Share of vote
! Seats 
! +/–
! Government
|-
! 2019
| 24,439
| 0.14%
| 
| –
| 
|}

Provincial elections

! rowspan=2 | Election
! colspan=2 | Eastern Cape
! colspan=2 | Free State
! colspan=2 | Gauteng
! colspan=2 | Kwazulu-Natal
! colspan=2 | Limpopo
! colspan=2 | Mpumalanga
! colspan=2 | North-West
! colspan=2 | Northern Cape
! colspan=2 | Western Cape
|-
! % !! Seats
! % !! Seats
! % !! Seats
! % !! Seats
! % !! Seats
! % !! Seats
! % !! Seats
! % !! Seats
! % !! Seats
|-
! 2019
| 0.24% || 0/63
| 0.18% || 0/30
| 0.13% || 0/73
| 0.12% || 0/80
| 0.10% || 0/49
| 0.15% || 0/30
| 0.20% || 0/33
| 0.14% || 0/30
| 0.15% || 0/42
|}

Municipal elections

|-
! Election
! Votes
! %
! Seats
|-
! 2021
| 5,444
| 0.02%
| 2
|-
|}

References

External links
Official Facebook page of the SRWP

Political parties based in Johannesburg
2019 establishments in South Africa
Communist parties in South Africa
Political parties established in 2019
Political parties in South Africa